This is a list of laser types, their operational wavelengths, and their applications. Thousands of kinds of laser are known, but most of them are used only for specialized research.

Overview

Gas lasers

Chemical lasers

Used as directed-energy weapons.

Dye lasers

Metal-vapor lasers

Solid-state lasers

Semiconductor lasers

Other types of lasers

See also
Laser construction
List of laser articles
Maser producing or amplifying a coherent microwave beam
X-ray laser producing a coherent x-ray or EUV beam
Atom laser producing a coherent beam of atoms
Gravity laser, a hypothetical concept of producing coherent gravitation waves

Notes

Further references

Silfvast, William T. Laser fundamentals, Cambridge University Press, 2004. 
Weber, Marvin J. Handbook of laser wavelengths, CRC Press, 1999.